The Sansa apple is a red apple with yellow streaks, first released commercially in 1988.
They ripen early in New England, starting in August, and by autumn they are no longer available.

References

Apple cultivars